Computer Systems Institute (CSI) is an unaccredited private for-profit college headquartered in Skokie, Illinois. It was founded in 1989 by Ella Zibitsker, its current chairman of the board.

History
Computer Systems Institute was founded in 1989 by Ella Zibitsker, its current chairman of the board. Julia Lowder is the current CEO. CSI offers a variety of career training programs and certificates in Computer Science, Hospitality, Customer Service, Marketing and English language.

In June 2011, CSI partnered with FORTE Knowledge in order to enhance its IT offerings in the Chicago area.

Since being founded in 1989, CSI has had over 10,000 graduates from 90+ countries.

2016 loss of accreditation
In February 2016 the U.S. Department of Education took action due to: "...deceptive marketing practices and defraud [of] taxpayers by giving out student aid inappropriately. These unscrupulous institutions use questionable business practices or outright lie to both students and the federal government.” (Under Secretary of Education for the United States Ted Mitchell) In April 2016, the Accrediting Council for Independent Colleges and Schools "ordered [CSI] to show cause why its accreditation from ACICS should not be withdrawn."  

Three programs were affected by the loss of accreditation and federal financial aid: Healthcare Career Program (HCP), Networking Career Program (NCP), and Business Career Program (BCP). Students enrolled in CSI's other programs, such as international students attending non-Title IV programs, were not directly affected by the losses.

Academics
CSI offers a variety of career training programs in Administration, Hospitality, Marketing, and English language programs. The student to professor ratio is 20 to 1.  Programs emphasize hands-on learning, industry current technologies, and preparation for professional certifications. CSI uses a blended learning methodology for its programs.   CSI employs 15 full-time and 43 part- time instructors.

Accreditation and approvals
CSI's accreditation by Accrediting Council for Independent Colleges and Schools (ASICS) was withdrawn by suspension on April 20, 2017. The suspension became final on May 8, 2017, after CSI failed to appeal.

CSI is an approved training provider in Illinois, Wisconsin, and Indiana for the Workforce Investment Act. It is also approved by the Department of Veterans Affairs to accept GI Bill benefits. and authorized to enroll non immigrant F-1 and M-1 students.

Campuses
Presently, the institution maintains Illinois campuses in Skokie (Corporate Headquarter), Chicago, Lombard, Illinois, and an out-of-state campus in Worcester and Charlestown.
 The Skokie campus occupies 12,000 square feet and is located 1/4 mile west of the Edens Expressway and approximately 200 yards north of the Skokie Swift, a major train and bus hub in Cook County, Illinois. Each classroom can seat 10-20 students, has high-speed Internet access and network connections, LCD projector, and a connection to networked printers. For students' safety, the campus is equipped with the security alarm system that is directly connected to the Skokie Police.
 The Chicago campus is walking distance from Millennium Park and resides on three floors of a high-rise building which is easily accessible via public transportation. The classrooms seat 20-40 students per class.
 The Charlestown Campus is located in the Schrafft Center on Sullivan Square in Charlestown, Massachusetts. The campus is a short walk from the Sullivan train station. The classrooms accommodate up to 40 students. CSI offers 18 hours per week of English classes in writing, grammar, reading, listening, and speaking in this location.

Tuition and financial aid
Tuition for one academic year is between $3,600 ~ $6,000. The average completion time for each programs at CSI is 12 months. Computer Systems Institute does not provide financial aid.

References

External links
 Official website

For-profit universities and colleges in the United States
Educational institutions established in 1989
1989 establishments in Illinois